Caledonian Railway Single No. 123 is a preserved Scottish steam locomotive. The unique 4-2-2 was built by Neilson and Company in 1886, works No. 3553, as an exhibition locomotive. In 1914 it was placed on the Caledonian Railway duplicate list, and renumbered 1123. It entered London, Midland and Scottish Railway service in 1923 and the LMS renumbered it 14010 and gave it the power classification 1P. During the 1920s it was allocated to working the directors' saloon, but it was returned to ordinary service in 1930. The locomotive was withdrawn in 1935, by which time it was the last single-wheeled express engine running in Britain, and set aside for preservation.

This engine could reach speeds of up to 60 mph (97 km/h).

Restored to steam by British Railways in 1958, it ran railtours and enthusiast specials until the end of steam in Scotland.

History

No. 123 was designed by the Caledonian Railway's chief locomotive engineer Dugald Drummond in partnership with Neilson and Company which built the locomotive. The engine was a one-off design intended to represent both the railway and the builder at the International Exhibition of Industry, Science and Art held in Edinburgh rather than to fulfill any specific need for such a locomotive by the Caledonian. At the time single-driver locomotives were out of favour with railway companies due to their limited grip, poor acceleration, limited hill-climbing ability and low tractive effort with increasingly-heavy trains. The few that remained in service were restricted to long runs on flat terrain with lightweight carriages. Drummond adapted No. 123's design from his recently introduced 66 Class 4-4-0 design (new examples of which were still being introduced to service when No. 123 was constructed). As locomotive superintendent of the Caledonian and designer of the 66 Class, protocol of the time dictated that Drummond was credited with the design of No. 123. However it is believed that William Weir (Drummond's chief draughtsman at the St. Rollox railway works) and Edward Snowball (Weir's counterpart at Neilson's) carried out the actual adaptation and design of the new Single. Drummond and the Caledonian also co-operated with another major Scottish locomotive builder, Dübs and Company, to produce a second engine for the same Exhibition. This resulted in Caledonian No. 124, a 4-4-0 which was, in essence, a more powerful 66 Class. Both engines were awarded gold medals for the Caledonian and their respective builders. 

The 'Exhibition Engine' used the same boiler, cylinders and front bogie as the 66 Class but an enlarged single driving wheel of seven feet (2.13 metres) diameter and a single trailing axle. Drummond had already designed a sanding system for the 66 Class. Sand was stored in sandboxes incorporated into the splasher for each front driving wheel and sprayed onto the track ahead of the driving wheels by compressed air supplied from the main air reservoir for the locomotive's Westinghouse air brake system. This was more efficient and reliable than the previous sanding systems which relied purely on gravity;  it allowed the driver to apply sand to the rails to greatly improve adhesion in difficult conditions. Such a system would overcome the primary drawback of the traditional 'single' locomotive - its poor adhesion, especially when starting away from rest with heavier trains - while retaining its ability to cover long distances at high speeds. The same system was therefore incorporated into No. 123. The year of the Caledonian Single's construction saw the invention of the steam sander by Francis Holt of the Midland Railway which in turn led to the introduction of the Midland's own 'Spinner' singles. The effectiveness of the sanding gear fitted to No. 123 and the Caledonian engine's strong performance coupled to the invention of Holt's steam sanding gear (which was more useful to the majority of British railway companies that used vacuum brakes rather than the Westinghouse system) led to a revival in the use of the 'single' for express passenger work in the late 19th century. 

No. 123 became nationally famous during the Race to the North of August 1888 when the companies on the east- and west-coast main lines between London and Edinburgh competed to have the fastest times. During the month of the 'races', No. 123 was employed to work West Coast expresses on the Caledonian's section of the route between Carlisle and Edinburgh - a distance of 100 miles (160 kilometres) including the climbs to Beattock Summit and Shotts Summit. As the only Caledonian engine capable of maintaining such speeds and the only one of her type, No. 123 was also used consistently throughout the month of the Races, being used on the fast northbound express every day for four weeks, which also proved the locomotive's reliability.
 
Following its appearance at the 1886 exhibition the locomotive was retained for special duties by the Caledonian, being used for double heading express trains over Beattock Summit and working inspectors' and directors' trains with only one or two saloon carriages. She was also the Caledonian's favoured engine to act as pilot to the Royal Train which frequently used the Caledonian Main Line when transporting the royal family to and from Balmoral Castle. The Royal Train pilot ran light-engine 15 minutes ahead of the Royal Train itself, to warn of the train's approach and as a safety measure to ensure the line was clear and safe. Requiring high speeds and with no load, the Single was ideal for these duties. 

In 1914, it was placed on the Caledonian Railway duplicate list and renumbered 1123. It entered London, Midland and Scottish Railway service in 1923 and the LMS renumbered it 14010 and gave it the power classification 1P. During the 1920s it was painted in LMS Maroon, and allocated to working the directors' saloon, but was returned to regular service on the Dundee to Perth mainline in 1930, painted LMS black. The locomotive was withdrawn in 1935, by which time it was the last single-wheeled express engine running in Britain, and set aside for preservation.

Restored to steam by British Railways in 1958, it ran railtours and enthusiast specials until the end of steam in Scotland. The engine is currently a static exhibit in the Riverside Museum in Pointhouse Place, Kelvinhaugh, Glasgow, to which it was moved when the former transport museum at Kelvinhall was closed.

Modelling
Tri-ang released a model of No.123 in the 1960s, in Caledonian livery and labelling. This model shared its chassis with the model of the Dean Single released at the same time, and was powered by its single driving wheel. Following the other styles of modelling at the time, the model was produced up until the 1970s. Later it was revived in the 1980s in LMS Crimson livery, and was subsequently released in a limited-edition pack in its Caledonian colors. In 2007, the locomotive was released in LMS Black livery, with DCC capability being added to allow the locomotive to fit the then current range. A train pack entitled 'The Last Single Wheeler' was introduced in 2010 featuring the locomotive in LMS Crimson livery again, with three LMS carriages of the time. London Road Models supply an etched kit for a 4mm model, which creates a model of 123 in its pre 1924 condition, when it was re-boilered by the LMS.

Preserved service log
15th September 1963 - The 'Scottish Belle' Railtour to Horsted Keynes and Brighton, 123 double-headed with preserved Drummond LSWR T9 class No. 30120
The Solway Ranger Railtour - 13 June 1964

See also 
 Locomotives of the Caledonian Railway

References

External links 

 Hornby's model of No.123, circa 1963
 Hornby's model of No.14040, circa 1983
 Hornby's 'The Last Single Wheeler' train pack, circa 2010

123
4-2-2 locomotives
Neilson locomotives
Railway locomotives introduced in 1886
Standard gauge steam locomotives of Great Britain